Howell Barnes (3 September 1887 – 31 August 1959) was a Barbadian cricketer. He played in four first-class matches for the Barbados cricket team in 1903/04 and 1904/05.

See also
 List of Barbadian representative cricketers

References

External links
 

1887 births
1959 deaths
Barbadian cricketers
Barbados cricketers
People from Saint Michael, Barbados